Research indicates that living in areas of high pollution has serious long term health effects. Living in these areas during childhood and adolescence can lead to diminished mental capacity and an increased risk of brain damage. People of all ages who live in high pollution areas for extended periods place themselves at increased risk of various neurological disorders. Both air pollution and heavy metal pollution have been implicated as having negative effects on central nervous system (CNS) functionality. The ability of pollutants to affect the neurophysiology of individuals after the structure of the CNS has become mostly stabilized is an example of negative neuroplasticity.

Air pollution
Air pollution is known to affect small and large blood vessels throughout the body.

High levels of air pollution are associated with increased risk of strokes and heart attacks. By permanently affecting vascular structures in the brain, air pollution can have serious effects on neural functioning and neural matter. In dogs, air pollution has been shown to cause damage to the CNS by altering the blood–brain barrier, causing neurons in the cerebral cortex to degenerate, destroying glial cells found in white matter, and causing neurofibrillary tangles. These changes can permanently alter brain structure and chemistry, resulting in various impairments and disorders. Sometimes, the effects of neural remodeling do not manifest themselves for a prolonged period of time.

Effects in adolescents and canines
A study from 2008 compared children and dogs raised in Mexico City (a location known for high pollution levels) with children and dogs raised in Polotitlán, Mexico (a city whose pollution levels meet the current US National Ambient Air Quality Standards). According to this study, children raised in areas of higher pollution scored lower in intelligence (i.e. on IQ tests), and showed signs of lesions in MRI scanning of the brain. In contrast, children from the low pollution area scored as expected on IQ tests, and did not show any significant sign of the risk of brain lesions. This correlation was found to be statistically significant, and shows that pollution levels may be related to, and contribute to, brain lesion formation and IQ scores, which, in turn, manifests as impaired intellectual capacity and/or performance. Living in high pollution areas thus places adolescents at risk of premature brain degeneration and improper neural development—these findings could have significant implications for future generations. With regard to traffic related air pollution, children of mothers exposed to higher levels during the first trimester of pregnancy were at increased risk of allergic sensitization at age 1 year.

Effects in adults
There are indications that the effects of physical activity and air pollution on neuroplasticity counteract. Physical activity is known for its health-enhancing benefits, particularly on the cardiovascular system, and has also demonstrated benefits for brain plasticity processes, cognition and mental health. The neurotrophine, brain-derived neurotrophic factor (BDNF) is thought to play a key role in exercise-induced cognitive improvements. Brief bouts of physical activity have been shown to increase serum levels of BDNF, but this increase may be offset by increased exposure to traffic-related air pollution.
Over longer periods of physical exercise, the cognitive improvements which were demonstrated in rural joggers were found to be absent in urban joggers who were partaking in the same 12-week start-2-run training programme.

Epilepsy
Researchers in Chile found statistically-significant correlations between multiple air pollutants and the risk of epilepsy using a 95% confidence interval. The air pollutants that the researchers attempted to correlate with increased incidence of epilepsy included carbon monoxide, ozone, sulfur dioxide, nitrogen dioxide, large particulate matter, and fine particulate matter. The researchers tested these pollutants across seven cities and, in all but one case, a correlation was found between pollutant levels and the occurrence of epilepsy. All of the correlations found were shown to be statistically significant. The researchers hypothesized that air pollutants increase epilepsy risk by increasing inflammatory mediators, and by providing a source of oxidative stress. They believe that these changes eventually alter the functioning of the blood–brain barrier, causing brain inflammation. Brain inflammation is known to be a risk factor for epilepsy; thus, the sequence of events provides a plausible mechanism by which pollution may increase epilepsy risk in individuals who are genetically vulnerable to the disease.

Dioxin poisoning
Organohalogen compounds, such as dioxins, are commonly found in pesticides or created as by-products of pesticide manufacture or degradation. These compounds can have a significant impact on the neurobiology of exposed organisms. Some observed effects of exposure to dioxins are altered astroglial intracellular calcium ion (Ca2+), decreased glutathione levels, modified neurotransmitter function in the CNS, and loss of pH maintenance. A study of 350 chemical plant employees exposed to a dioxin precursor for herbicide synthesis between 1965 and 1968 showed that 80 of the employees displayed signs of dioxin poisoning. Of these 350 employees, 15 were contacted again in 2004 to submit to neurological tests to assess whether the dioxin poisoning had any long-term effects on neurological capabilities. The amount of time that had passed made it difficult to assemble a larger cohort, but the results of the tests indicated that eight of the 15 subjects exhibited some central nervous system impairment, nine showed signs of polyneuropathy, and electroencephalography (EEG) showed various degrees of structural abnormalities. This study suggested that the effects of dioxins were not limited to initial toxicity. Dioxins, through neuroplastic effects, can cause long-term damage that may not manifest itself for years or even decades.

Metal exposure
Heavy metal exposure can result in an increased risk of various neurological diseases. Research indicates that the two most neurotoxic heavy metals are mercury and lead. The impact that these two metals will have is highly dependent upon the individual due to genetic variations. Mercury and lead are particularly neurotoxic for many reasons: they easily cross cell membranes, have oxidative effects on cells, react with sulfur in the body (leading to disturbances in the many functions that rely upon sulfhydryl groups), and reduce glutathione levels inside cells. Methylmercury, in particular, has an extremely high affinity for sulfhydryl groups.  Organomercury is a particularly damaging form of mercury because of its high absorbability Lead also mimics calcium, a very important mineral in the CNS, and this mimicry leads to many adverse effects. Mercury's neuroplastic mechanisms work by affecting protein production. Elevated mercury levels increase glutathione levels by affecting gene expression, and this in turn affects two proteins (MT1 and MT2) that are contained in astrocytes and neurons. Lead's ability to imitate calcium allows it to cross the blood–brain barrier. Lead also upregulates glutathione.

Autism

Heavy metal exposure, when combined with certain genetic predispositions, can place individuals at increased risk for developing autism. Many examples of CNS pathophysiology, such as oxidative stress, neuroinflammation, and mitochondrial dysfunction, could be by-products of environmental stressors such as pollution. There have been reports of autism outbreaks occurring in specific locations. Since these cases of autism are related to geographic location, the implication is that something in the environment is complementing an at-risk genotype to cause autism in these vulnerable individuals. Mercury and lead both contribute to inflammation, leading scientists to speculate that these heavy metals could play a role in autism. These findings are controversial, however, with many researchers believing that increasing rates of autism are a consequence of more accurate screening and diagnostic methods, and are not due to any sort of environmental factor.

Accelerated neural aging
Neuroinflammation is associated with increased rates of neurodegeneration. Inflammation tends to increase naturally with age. By facilitating inflammation, pollutants such as air particulates and heavy metals cause the CNS to age more quickly. Many late-onset diseases are caused by neurodegeneration. Multiple sclerosis, Parkinson's disease, amyotrophic lateral sclerosis (ALS), and Alzheimer's disease are all believed to be exacerbated by inflammatory processes, resulting in individuals displaying signs of these diseases at an earlier age than is typically expected.

Multiple sclerosis occurs when chronic inflammation leads to the compromise of oligodendrocytes, which in turn leads to the destruction of the myelin sheath. Then axons begin exhibiting signs of damage, which in turn leads to neuron death. Multiple sclerosis has been correlated to living in areas with high particulate matter levels in the air.

In Parkinson's disease, inflammation leading to depletion of antioxidant stores will ultimately lead to dopaminergic neuron degeneration, causing a shortage of dopamine and contributing to the formation of Parkinson's disease. Chronic glial activation as a result of inflammation causes motor neuron death and compromises astrocytes, these factors leading to the symptoms of amyotrophic lateral sclerosis (ALS, aka Lou Gehrig's disease).

In the case of Alzheimer's disease, inflammatory processes lead to neuron death by inhibiting growth at axons and activating astrocytes that produce proteoglycans.  This product can only be deposited in the hippocampus and cortex, indicating that this may be the reason these two areas show the highest levels of degeneration in Alzheimer's disease. Airborne metal particulates have been shown to directly access and affect the brain through olfactory pathways, which allows a large amount of particulate matter to reach the blood–brain barrier.

These facts, coupled with air pollution's link to neurofibrillary tangles and the observed subcortical vascular changes observed in dogs, imply that the negative neuroplastic effects of pollution could result in increased risk for Alzheimer's disease, and could also implicate pollution as a cause of early-onset Alzheimer's disease through multiple mechanisms. The general effect of pollution is increased levels of inflammation. As a result, pollution can significantly contribute to various neurological disorders that are caused by inflammatory processes.

References

Pollution
Neuroplasticity